Do Ansoo, (Two Tears) is Pakistani film made in 1949 and released on 7 April 1950. Starring Santosh Kumar, M. Ajmal, Sabiha Khanum and Allauddin, it was the first directorial success of director Anwar Kamal Pasha.

The music was composed by Mubarak Ali, became an instant hit and Sheikh Lateef's Naubahar Films, as a result, got some recognition due to the film's success. Do Ansoo attained a 25-week viewing after being released on 7 April 1950, rendering it the first ever Urdu language film to celebrate a silver jubilee in the new Pakistani film industry.

Cast 

 M. Ajmal
 Allauddin
 Gulshan Ara
 Himalaywala
 Asif Jah
 Santosh Kumar
 Sabiha Khanum
 Shah Nawaz
 Shamim Bano

References

External links
 

1950 films
Urdu-language Pakistani films
Pakistani drama films
1950s Urdu-language films
1950 drama films
Pakistani black-and-white films